Andrei Medvedev (born 14 October 1993) is a Russian luger. He competed in the men's doubles event at the 2018 Winter Olympics.

References

External links
 

1993 births
Living people
Russian male lugers
Olympic lugers of Russia
Lugers at the 2018 Winter Olympics
Place of birth missing (living people)